Jo Mazelis (born 1956) is a Welsh writer. Her 2014 novel Significance was awarded the Jerwood Fiction Uncovered Prize 2015. Her short story collections have been short- or long-listed for prizes, including Wales Book of the Year. She has also worked as a professional graphic designer.

Early life and career
Mazelis was born near Fairwood Common on the Gower Peninsula. She grew up in Swansea, later living in Aberystwyth and then London for over 14 years before returning to her hometown. She worked as a graphic designer for Spare Rib, Undercurrents, Women’s Review, Everywoman and City Limits. She did a Foundation Course at Swansea College of Art, and was awarded a Higher Datec Diploma from Ealing College of Higher Education, a degree in Art & English from Swansea Metropolitan University and an MA in English Literature from Swansea University.

Writing and awards
Mazelis's novel Significance (2014) was awarded the Jerwood Fiction Uncovered Prize 2015.

Her first collection of short stories, Diving Girls (2002), was shortlisted for both Wales Book of the Year and Commonwealth Best First Book.

Her second collection of stories, Circle Games (2005), was long-listed for Wales Book of the Year.

Mazelis's third collection, Ritual, 1969 (2016), was long-listed for the Edge Hill Prize  and shortlisted for Wales Book of the Year in 2017.

In 2014 Mazelis wrote a collection of surreal dystopian fiction for Go! Be a Bird!, a collaborative work with award-winning artist Susan Adams.

Several of her stories have also been broadcast on BBC Radio 4 including Too Perfect, Snakeskin Becomes Her and The Blackberry Season.

Mazelis's work has appeared in The Lonely Crowd, New Welsh Review, Spare Rib, Poetry Wales, Raconteur, Cambrensis, Nth Position, The Big Issue, Corridor, The Ottawa Citizen, Everywoman, Tears in the Fence and Lampeter Review amongst others.

She has won a prize in the Rhys Davies Short Story Award five times, was longlisted for the Asham Award and received prizes in the PenFRO  and Allen Raine competitions.

Mazelis was a Royal Literary Fund fellow at Swansea University 2009-11 and is currently a lector on the Royal Literary Fund Reading Round in Swansea.

Reviews
Reviewing Circle Games, Anna Scott in the New Welsh Review wrote: "Mazelis plays with the reader, introducing the unexpected by the back door. Fearlessly scrutinising the desires and impulses of her characters, segueing nightmarish fantasies into reality."

Reviewing Ritual, 1969, Rupert Dastur in The Short Story wrote: "Mazelis explores a dazzling range of ideas, geographies and times, often couched in the daily realities of women and children, the marginalised and the powerless, the scared, hopeless, and hapless ... Ritual, 1969 reveals the absolute mastery Mazelis has over the short form and this third collection is a superb display of a writer keenly attentive to the human mind, its motives and its mysteries.".

Photography
While working for magazines in London in the 1980s Mazelis photographed writers such as P.D. James, Patricia Highsmith and Kathy Acker, artists Paula Rego and Nan Goldin, and actors Miranda Richardson and Tilda Swinton amongst others. Since returning to Wales she has photographed a number of Welsh artists and writers including Ed Thomas, Francesca Rhydderch, Lloyd Robson, Kevin Sinnott, David Hurn, Rachel Trezise, Richard Davies, Tristan Hughes, Rhian Elizabeth and musicians Richard Cowell (Rag Foundation) and Paul Battenbough.

Mazelis has exhibited her artwork at Camerawork, London and the Glynn Vivian Art Gallery, and had solo exhibitions at The Camera Club, London and The Dylan Thomas Centre, and a joint show at the Pontardawe Arts Centre. Her photography has been used for a variety of publications from online journals to print magazine covers and book jackets.

Film
In the 1980s Mazelis collaborated as a screenwriter for a student film in which she also acted. She also acted in a Super 8 film The Fate of Cain made by Barry Assinder which was shown at the London Film Festival.

Selected publications
Diving Girls (short stories, Parthian, 2002; published in Danish translation as Forbuden Frugt by Arvids, 2007)

Circle Games (short stories, Parthian, 2005)

Significance (novel, Seren, 2014)

Ritual, 1969 (short stories, Seren, 2016)

References

External links
 Official website
 Interview by Rupert Dastur in The Short Story (2015)
 In conversation with Jo Mazelis, Wales Arts Review, 2015
 Jo Mazelis in conversation with David Hurn, Wales Arts Review, 2015
 Interview in AmeriCymru (2014)
 Video/audio reading from Significance and Ritual, 1969 at International Literature Showcase

1956 births
Living people
20th-century Welsh people
20th-century Welsh women
21st-century British short story writers
21st-century Welsh novelists
21st-century Welsh women writers
21st-century Welsh writers
Welsh short story writers
People from the Gower Peninsula
Alumni of Swansea University
Alumni of Swansea Metropolitan University
Alumni of the University of West London
Welsh women novelists
Women graphic designers
British graphic designers
British women short story writers